The Kalvan series is a series of science fiction novels started by H. Beam Piper and continued by his authority John F. Carr, about a Pennsylvania police officer who is transported to an alternate world.  The series is part of Piper's Paratime series and features many of the characters from that series.  The police officer, Calvin Morrison, is picked up by a "cross-time flying saucer" (really a Paratime conveyor) and dropped off in an alternate Pennsylvania where "Aryans" (speakers of Indo-European languages) migrated east across Asia and the Pacific Ocean and arrived in North America.  This is different from the real world, where they moved west into Europe.

Books
The Kalvan series consists of eight books, one by Piper (Lord Kalvan of Otherwhen), one by John F. Carr and Roland J. Green (Great Kings' War), one by John F. Carr and Wolfgang Diehr (The Hos-Blethan Affair), and five by John F. Carr alone (Kalvan Kingmaker, Siege of Tarr-Hostigos, Fireseed War, Gunpowder God and Down Styphon!).

Races and cultures

Zarthani
The Zarthani are a group of Indo-European descendants who speak a language which belongs to a branch of Indo-European unattested in our timeline, but which has some superficial resemblances to ancient Greek in sounds and word-endings (but not in grammar).  The words for "father" and "mother" in Zarthani are phadros and mavra (from Proto-Indo-European  and ).  The Zarthani are the inhabitants of the five Great Kingdoms.

Urgothi
The Urgothi are a race of proto-Germans.  A thousand years after the arrival of the Ros-Zarthani, the Urgothi arrived from the Cold Lands.  They found the coastal areas settled by the Ros-Zarthani and so they moved east and south into the Sea of Grass (the Great Plains) and near the Great River (the Mississippi River).

The Urgothi created the Middle Kingdoms, including Grefftscharr.

Ruthani
The Ruthani are the real world Native Americans.  They are considered barbarians by the Zarthani, who virtually exterminated the Eastern Ruthani when they arrived in the area to become the Great Kingdoms.

Great Kingdoms
The North American Atlantic coast is the location of the Great Kingdoms.  These kingdoms are inhabited by the Zarthani and are the main location of the series.  Originally there were five Great Kingdoms (Hos-Zygros, Hos-Agrys, Hos-Harphax, Hos-Ktemnos, and Hos-Bletha), but at the end of Lord Kalvan of Otherwhen, the new Great Kingdom of Hos-Hostigos is formed.  Part way through the series, Kalvan also recognizes a seventh Great Kingdom, Hos-Rathon.  Neither Hos-Hostigos nor Hos-Rathon are recognized by any of the other Great Kingdoms.

Another Zarthani political entity outside the framework of the Great Kingdoms is Trygath, in the Ohio valley.  The Ohio River was not along the Zarthani eastwards migration routes, and Trygath is a semi-barbarous area known for its horse-breeding, and not considered Hos or "Great".

Hos-Hostigos
Hos-Hostigos was formed from the princedoms of Hostigos (also known as Old Hostigos), Nostor, Sask, Beshta, Nyklos, and Ulthor, which were all former princedoms of Hos-Harphax, as well as the new princedom of Sashta.  Since Hos-Hostigos was formed out of the territory of the Great Kingdom of Hos-Harphax, it was therefore not recognised as a Great Kingdom by any of the other kingdoms.  It was founded after the arrival of  Kalvan, who became its first king while dramatically improving the armies of Hos-Hostigos, attempting to eliminate pikemen altogether from the Royal Army (and replace them with musketeers).  Kalvan also has started construction of the Great Kings' Highway, which is a two-lane stone road running through the kingdom.
The flag of Hos-Hostigos is decreed to be a red keystone (i.e. the symbol of Calvin Morrison's native Pennsylvania) on a dark green field.

Hostigos
The princedom of Hostigos, also known as Old Hostigos, is the first princedom of the kingdom of Hos-Hostigos founded by Kalvan. At the time of Kalvan's arrival, Hostigos consisted of all of Centre County, southern Clinton County, and Lycoming County, Pennsylvania south of the Bald Eagle Mountains and was ruled by Prince Ptosphes. Its flag is a blue halberd-head on a red field.  After Kalvan married Ptosphes' daughter Rylla, Kalvan became heir to Old Hostigos.

Hostigos' capital (and the capital of Hos-Hostigos) is Hostigos Town (soon to become Hostigos City, built on the site of real-world Bellefonte, Pennsylvania).  Notable castles include Tarr-Hostigos, the home of Prince Ptosphes, which defends Hostigos Town.

Sask
Sask, consisting of Blair and parts of Clearfield, Huntington, and Bedford Counties in Pennsylvania, is one of Old Hostigos' former enemies ruled by the gluttonous Prince Sarrask. After the extremely bloody Battle of Fyk and the capture of Sarrask, Sask becomes an important tool in Kalvan's war against Styphon's House.  Sask's capital is Sask Town (on the site of real-world Hollidaysburg, Pennsylvania), and its flag is a golden-rayed sun on a green field.

Nostor
To the north-east of Hostigos, Nostor—consisting of Tioga and parts of Northumberland, Lycoming and Montour Counties to the forks of the Susquehanna—is another one of Old Hostigos' former enemies.  At the time of Kalvan's arrival, Nostor was ruled by the cruel Prince Gormoth and was to be the main arm of the Styphon's House attack on Hostigos. After the defeats at the siege of Tarr-Dombra and the Battle of Fitra (aka "that Dralm-damned battle," fought in heavy fog), Hostigi troops invaded and burned much of southern Nostor, leading to a free-for-all civil war in Nostor.

Soon after the formation of Hos-Hostigos, the civil war ended when Gormoth was killed and replaced by Prince Pheblon, who agreed to join Hos-Hostigos.  Nostor's capital is Nostor Town (near real-world Hughesville, Pennsylvania), and its flag is an orange lily on a black field.

Beshta
Beshta is located in the Besh (Juniata) River Valley, south-east of Old Hostigos and was ruled by Prince Baltar when Kalvan arrived in Hostigos.  Its colors are black and pale yellow.

Beshta was set to scavenge plunder from the Nostori and Saski invasion of Hostigos when Kalvan arrived, and Balthar sent his brother Balthames to aid Sarrask at the Battle of Fyk. After Balthames' tactical blunder led to victory for Hostigos, Balthar was forced to accept the lordship of King Kalvan and enter into the new kingdom of Hos-Hostigos.

After Balthar's betrayal at the Battle of Tenebra, Balthar was executed and replaced by Prince Phrames.

Sashta
The princedom of Sashta was created out of eastern Sask, western Beshta, and southern Hostigos by order of King Kalvan as a means of keeping Balthar's brother, Balthames from causing any trouble or from wielding any real power.

Nyklos
Nyklos is located north-west of Old Hostigos and consists of Potter and McKean County, Pennsylvania. Nyklos is ruled by Prince Armanes and a truly voluntarily princedom of the new kingdom of Hos-Hostigos.

Ulthor
Ulthor is a voluntary princedom of Hos-Hostigos and is located in the north-western corner of Hos-Hostigos and contains the only port in the kingdom (real world Erie).

Hos-Harphax
Hos-Harphax is the original Great Kingdom of the princedoms that joined to form Hos-Hostigos.  Hos-Harphax is one of the older Great Kingdoms and was created when the trading city of Harphax City at the mouth of the Susquehanna River began to exert its influence on the other cities, towns, and villages upstream from Harphax City.  At the beginning of the Kalvan series, Hos-Harphax includes the territory of real-world Pennsylvania, Maryland, Delaware, and southern New Jersey, and is ruled by Great King Kaiphranos, who dies in Kalvan Kingmaker.

Hos-Ktemnos
Hos-Ktemnos has one of the best militaries in the Great Kingdoms, consisting of the Sacred Squares.  Hos-Ktemnos is located in Virginia, North Carolina and South Carolina and is the site of the city of Balph, the headquarters of Styphon's House.

Hos-Bletha
Hos-Bletha is the southernmost Great Kingdom (consisting of real world Florida and Georgia) and was originally a part of Hos-Ktemnos.

Hos-Agrys
Hos Agrys is based in New York state, northern New Jersey, and southwestern Quebec, with its capital at Agrys City (Manhattan Island).

Hos-Zygros
Includes New England, most of Quebec, and part of eastern Ontario.  The capital, Zygros City, is on the site of the real-world city of Quebec.

Middle Kingdoms
The Middle Kingdoms are located in central North America.  They include Grefftscharr, a major trading city, Rathon, and Dorg.  Rathon was later recognized by Great King Kalvan as the seventh Great Kingdom of Hos-Rathon.

Grefftscharr
Grefftscharr is a Kingdom centered around a major trading city in the location of our Chicago and strongest of the Middle Kingdoms.  In the Kalvan series, Paratime Police Chief Verkan Vall establishes a cover of being from Grefftscharr when he helps Kalvan.  Grefftscharr covers the area of Illinois, Wisconsin, Michigan, Indiana, Western Ohio and Southern Ontario around the Great Lakes.

Styphon's House
Styphon's House is the temple of the god Styphon, originally a minor healer god, but who rose to prominence when his priests gained a monopoly control on the manufacture of gunpowder, and began to actively intervene in politics and finance.  The main temple of Styphon's House is in the city of Balph, located in the Great Kingdom of Hos-Ktemnos.

Holy Order of the Zarthani Knights
The Holy Order of the Zarthani Knights is one of the two military arms of Styphon's House.  The Knights defend the Great Kingdoms of Hos-Ktemnos and Hos-Bletha from the barbarians of the Sastragath.  The Knights are similar to the real world's crusading orders.

The Knights are divided up into Lances, which are then combined into Wedges.

Styphon's Own Guard
Styphon's Own Guard is the other military branch of Styphon's House. The soldiers in this military wear red armor and have been known to kill friendly soldiers who try to flee the battlefield.

The Great Kings' War
The Great Kings' War is the war between Great King Kalvan and Styphon's House.  The war also involves the pro-Styphon Great Kingdoms of Hos-Harphax and Hos-Ktemnos and the Pro-Kalvan/Anti-Styphon forces of Hos-Rathon and the Urgothi "barbarians" led by Warlord Ranjar Sargos.  The war is to some extent a continuation of the Hostigos War of Unification (shown in Lord Kalvan of Otherwhen).  The war begins in the book Great Kings' War.

Battles and Campaigns

Great Kings' War
 The Battle of Chothros Heights (Kalvan victory) -- The battle where Kalvan utterly defeated the Harphaxi Royal Army and destroyed three lances of Zarthani Knights.
 The Battle of Tenebra (Styphon's House victory) -- The battle where the Styphoni (led by Grand Master Soton), defeated the Hostigi army led by Prince Ptosphes because of the treachery of Balthar of Beshta
 The Battle of Phyrax (Kalvan victory) -- The extremely bloody battle in which Kalvan repulsed the Styphoni Holy Host from Hostigos after the Battle of Tenebra.

See also

 Lord Kalvan of Otherwhen
 Great Kings' War
 Kalvan Kingmaker
 Siege at Tarr-Hostigos
 Minor Characters in the Kalvan series
 Kalvan (Calvin Morrison)

References

 John F. Carr, Kalvan Kingmaker, Pequod Press, 2000, pages 14–16 (information on the history of the Zarthani and Urgothi)

Notes

 
Novels by H. Beam Piper
Novels by John F. Carr